Tung Tau Tsuen is the name of several features in Hong Kong:

 Tung Tau Tsuen (Yuen Long Kau Hui), in the Yuen Long Kau Hui area, next to Yuen Long Station, Yuen Long
 Tung Tau Tsuen (Ha Tsuen), in the Ha Tsuen area, this one closer to Tin Shui Wai Station, Yuen Long
 Tung Tau Tsuen (Kowloon), a village that was located in Kowloon
 Tung Tau Tsuen Road, a street in Kowloon City District and Wong Tai Sin District of Hong Kong
 Tung Tau Estate, a public housing estate on that road

See also:
 Tung Tau Wai, a village in Wang Chau, Yuen Long District
 Tung Tau Wai San Tsuen (lit. 'Tung Tau Wai New Village'), adjacent to Tung Tau Wai